Shona Hunter Dunn (born 15 October 1969) is a British civil servant, serving  as the Second Permanent Secretary at the Home Office.

Biography
Dunn read for a BSc in biology at the University of Birmingham and then an MSc in ecology at Durham University, where her thesis was on "the affects (sic) of habitat fragmentation on the woodland edge micro-climate and on the structure and composition of woodland ground flora", after which she joined the Department for Environment in 1995 as a policy adviser. She rose through the various re-organisations of the department (Department of the Environment, Transport and the Regions, Office of the Deputy Prime Minister, and the Department for Communities and Local Government) and a stint as policy head of Westminster City Council in 2005–6, serving as the director for Fire and Resilience for 2008–11 and then for planning for 2011–13.

In 2013, Dunn was promoted to serve as director-general for education standards in the Department for Education, replacing Stephen Meek. After three years, she was appointed as the next Head of the Economic and Domestic Affairs Secretariat, replacing Jonathan Slater in 2016. In Summer 2018, it was announced that Dunn would be promoted to replace Patsy Wilkinson as the Second Permanent Secretary for the Home Office.

On 29 February 2020, she was appointed acting permanent secretary at the Home Office, following the sudden resignation of Sir Philip Rutnam. She returned to her role as Second Permanent Secretary following the appointment of Matthew Rycroft as Permanent Secretary in March 2020.

In April 2021 Dunn left the Home Office to become Second Permanent Secretary at the Department of Health and Social Care.

Offices held

References

External links 
 Dunn's page on gov.uk

Living people
British Permanent Secretaries
1969 births
Alumni of the University of Birmingham
Alumni of Durham University